Audubon Terrace, also known as the Audubon Terrace Historic District, is a landmark complex of eight early-20th century Beaux Arts/American Renaissance buildings located on the west side of Broadway, bounded by West 155th and West 156th Streets, in the Washington Heights neighborhood of upper Manhattan, New York City.  Home to several cultural institutions, the architecturally complementary buildings, which take up most of a city block, are arranged in two parallel rows facing each other across a common plaza.  The complex is directly across 155th Street from Trinity Church Cemetery.

Although the 157th Street station on the New York City Subway's  is one block away, the complex's location considerably north of Midtown Manhattan has resulted in a perceived detriment to easy access for visitors.  The complex was designated a New York City landmark in 1979, and was added to the National Register of Historic Places in 1980.

History
Named for naturalist and artist John James Audubon, on whose former land the complex sits, Audubon Terrace was commissioned in 1907 by Archer Milton Huntington, the heir to the Southern Pacific Railroad fortune, a philanthropist and a Spanish scholar. The master plan for the site was drawn up by his cousin, architect Charles P. Huntington, in 1908.  Archer Huntington chose the location at a time when the two centuries old northward march of fashionable residences and cultural institutions seemed likely to transform the largely rural area.  He assumed that other museums and learned societies would soon join him, creating an intellectual citadel atop the island's heights.  The widespread adoption of the elevator and steel framing at this time, however, led Manhattan real estate to begin to develop vertically instead and New York's other great cultural institutions failed to follow suit - in fact, most of the organizations which located on Audubon Terrace were headed by or strongly connected to Huntington.

In 1904, Huntington had founded the Hispanic Society of America, and had commissioned Charles Huntington to design a building for the new institution on the grounds of what would become Audubon Terrace.  Huntington's original building was constructed from 1904–08, with a west wing by Huntington added in 1915 along with an east wing designed by Erik Strindberg.  In 1923-30, a library for the Society was added across the plaza, designed by H. Brooks Price. The next institutions to locate on the site all had their buildings designed by Charles Huntington: the American Numismatic Society, built in 1907, the American Geographical Society (1911), the Spanish-speaking Church of Our Lady of Esperanza (1909–12; West 156th Street addition and remodeling in 1924 by Lawrence G. White, Stanford White's son), and the Museum of the American Indian (1915–22).

In 1921-23, William M. Kendall of McKim, Mead & White designed an Anglo-Italian Renaissance building for the American Academy of Arts and Letters and the National Institute of Arts and Letters, which was followed by an auditorium and gallery for them designed by Cass Gilbert and built in 1928-30. The two organizations merged as the American Academy and Institute of Arts and Letters in 1976.

The plaza surrounding these buildings is the location of a number of sculptures executed by Anna Hyatt Huntington, Archer Huntington's wife, between 1927 and 1944.  These include a large equestrian statue of the legendary Spanish knight El Cid (1927), in front of the Hispanic Society Library.

Resident institutions
A number of the original institutions are no longer resident on the Terrace:

The American Geographical Society, founded in 1851, moved its collection of maps, photographs, books, journals and atlases - the largest map collection in the world - to the campus of the University of Wisconsin–Milwaukee in 1978.  The AGS was replaced on Audubon Terrace by a campus of Boricua College, a bilingual college.
The Heye Foundation's Museum of the American Indian (founded in 1916) merged into the National Museum of the American Indian, a component of the Smithsonian Institution which opened in 2004 on the National Mall in Washington, D.C., with a small permanent gallery remaining in New York City in the Custom House at Bowling Green. The space occupied by the Museum of the American Indian is now used by the Hispanic Society.
The American Numismatic Society, founded in 1858, moved in 2008 to a facility on Varick Street in downtown Manhattan. This building has been taken over by the American Academy of Arts and Letters as an Annex, and the space between it and the original Academy building was converted in 2009 into a new entrance link designed by James Vincent Czajka with Pei Cobb Freed & Partners.

Of the remaining original institutions, the Hispanic Society is renovating its existing space as well as expanding into the space left vacant by the Museum of the American Indian, a project that will take several years to complete. A plan to move the Hispanic Society downtown was contemplated in 2006 but ultimately not carried out. Some of its collection is on tour, and so far, has been sent to Madrid, Mexico City, and Albuquerque. The Society maintains a library and a museum with an important collection of art and artifacts from the Iberian peninsula, with some items from Spanish America.

The American Academy of Arts and Letters was founded in 1898.  Its gallery is open to the public Tuesdays through Saturdays from 1 pm to 4 pm, except from March to June, when it is open Thursdays through Sundays from 1 pm to 4 pm.

See also
List of New York City Landmarks
National Register of Historic Places listings in New York County, New York
Audubon Mural Project
Huntington family

References
Notes

Bibliography

External links

 Audubon Terrace Gallery - 96 photos

Historic districts in Manhattan
New York City Designated Landmarks in Manhattan
New York City designated historic districts
Buildings and structures in Manhattan
Outdoor sculptures in Manhattan
Historic districts on the National Register of Historic Places in Manhattan
Washington Heights, Manhattan